The Bishop of Kilfenora was a separate episcopal title which took its name after the village of Kilfenora in County Clare in the Republic of Ireland. In both the Church of Ireland and the Roman Catholic Church, the title is now united with other bishoprics.

History
The monastery at Kilfenora was reportedly founded by Saint Fachanan in the sixth century. It was not until March 1152 that the diocese of Kilfenora was established at the Synod of Kells. The diocese corresponded with the ancient territory of Corcomroe. Part of the Archdiocese of Cashel, it only extended over 200 square miles of very thinly populated land. It was reckoned the poorest diocese, with only 13 parishes. Demand for the position of bishop thus was not great, but for 1189 a bishop is recorded. In 1660, Samuel Pullen was made Archbishop of Tuam and Kilfenora became part of his province.

After the Reformation, there were parallel apostolic successions.

In the Church of Ireland, Kilfenora continued as a separate see until it was combined with Killaloe to form the united bishopric of Killaloe and Kilfenora in 1752. Under the Church Temporalities (Ireland) Act 1833, the united see became one of the sees held by bishops of Killaloe and Clonfert in 1834. Since 1976, Kilfenora has been one of the sees held by the bishops of Limerick and Killaloe.

The Roman Catholic Church bishopric of Kilfenora continued as a separate title until 1750 when Pope Benedict XIV decreed that it to be united with the bishopric of Kilmacduagh. Since Kilmacduagh was in the Ecclesiastical province of Tuam while Kilfenora was in the Province of Cashel, it was arranged that the ordinary of the united dioceses was to be alternately bishop of one diocese and apostolic administrator of the other. The first holder of this unusual arrangement was Peter Kilkelly, who had been Bishop of Kilmacduagh since 1744, and became Apostolic Administrator of Kilfenora in September 1750. In 1866, Patrick Fallon, the sitting Bishop of Kilmacduagh and Apostolic Administrator of Kilfenora, resigned due to ill health, and John McEvilly, the Bishop of Galway, was appointed Apostolic Administrator of both Kilmacduagh and Kilfenora. McEvilly would be named Coadjutor Archbishop of Tuam in 1878 but retained his duties in Galway until he eventually succeeded to the Tuam archdiocesan throne in 1881. Upon McEvilly's succession in Tuam, the three sees of Galway, Kilmacduagh, and Kilfenora remained vacant for two years. In 1883, Pope Leo XIII combined the dioceses of Galway and Kilmacduagh into a unified see, and made the Bishop of Galway and Kilmacduagh Apostolic Administrator of Kilfenora in perpetuum.

Pre-Reformation bishops

Post-Reformation bishops

Church of Ireland succession

Roman Catholic succession

References

Bibliography

 
 
 
 

Religion in County Clare
Kilfenora
Kilfenora
Kilfenora
Former Roman Catholic bishoprics in Ireland